Tara Pilven (born 2 August 1993) is a retired Australian badminton player who competed at international level events. She is a four-time Oceanian medalist and has competed at the 2010 Summer Youth Olympics.

References

1993 births
Living people
Sportspeople from Ballarat
Australian female badminton players
Badminton players at the 2010 Summer Youth Olympics